Ortley is a former town in Wasco County, Oregon, in the United States. It is still classed as a populated place by the USGS.

History
Ortley was originally developed by the Hood River Orchard & Land Company which filed a plat for the townsite in 1911, naming it for the 'Ortley', a variety of apple.  The company sold town lots and small orchard parcels, and Ortley quickly grew to a population of 300.   The community included a post office, several shops and a hotel.  However, the land proved unsuitable for apple production because of the prevailing high winds and scarcity of water.  By 1922, the town was all but abandoned, and in that year the post office closed.

See also
List of ghost towns in Oregon

References

Further reading

External links
Image of Ortley's combination community center, store and post office from Columbia Gorge Discovery Center (CGDC)
Image of hotel under construction at Ortley from the CGDC
Images of the Ortley area from Flickr

Company towns in Oregon
Ghost towns in Oregon
Former populated places in Wasco County, Oregon
1911 establishments in Oregon